Tappahannock–Essex County Airport  is a public-use airport located five nautical miles (9 km) south of the central business district of Tappahannock, a town in Essex County, Virginia, United States. It is owned by the Tappahannock Essex County Airport Authority.

Opened in 2007 and located near Route 360 at St. Paul's Crossroads, this airport replaced the former Tappahannock Municipal Airport  which was located near the intersection of Route 17 & Airport Road.

Although most U.S. airports use the same three-letter location identifier for the FAA and IATA, Tappahannock–Essex County Airport is assigned XSA by the FAA but has no designation from the IATA.

Facilities and aircraft 

In 2014 there were 23 Aircraft based on the field, of which 19 were single engine, 3 multi engine and 1 helicopter. For a 12-Month period ending 31 December 2014 there were an average of 23 Operations per day, 50% of which were local general aviation, 23% air taxi, 18% military and 10% transient general aviation.

History
Ground was broken for the airport in 2005. The flight  strip was paid for by local tax payers and a federal grant, replacing Tappahannock Municipal Airport which was abandoned following the opening of Tappahannock–Essex County Airport.

References

 Shaw, Frederick J. (2004), Locating Air Force Base Sites History's Legacy, Air Force History and Museums Program, United States Air Force, Washington DC, 2004.

External links

Airports in Virginia
Buildings and structures in Essex County, Virginia
Transportation in Essex County, Virginia
Airports established in 2007
2007 establishments in Virginia